Folio, also known as Folio: The Magazine of Magazine Management and Folio: magazine,  is a trade magazine for the magazine industry.
The magazine was established in 1972 by Joe Hanson of Hanson Publications, Inc. and became  known as "the bible of the magazine publishing industry".

Associated initiatives include The FOLIO: Show, a magazine industry trade show and conference;
FOLIO: 400, a comprehensive review of major America magazines;
The FOLIO: Ad Guide, analyzing magazine advertising; 
and the FOLIO: Source Book, a buyer’s guide for publishers.
The publishers of Folio also organize the Eddie & Ozzie Awards in recognition of high-quality magazines and induct new members into the Editorial & Design Hall of Fame.

As of 2020, it was announced that Folio magazine would cease publication. However, the publisher would continue to support its other industry activities.

Overview
The publishing company name is Folio Publishing Corporation. It also produces two special annual editions:
 Folio: 400 and
 Folio: Ad Guide

The magazine covers various financial and publishing aspects of the magazine publishing industry. Many stories focus on a particular periodical. Folio is a "vertical" publication "aimed at people who hold different jobs within" the magazine publishing industry.

Awards
Folio gives awards in various categories: The Washington Post'''s Annie Granatstein received Folios Top Women in Media 2019 award; The Post and The New York Times'' received awards in 2020.

References

External links
 Folio magazine site

Business magazines published in the United States
Magazines with year of establishment missing